The Deep: Here Be Dragons is an original graphic novel from Gestalt Publishing written by award-winning writer Tom Taylor (Injustice: Gods Among Us, Superior Iron Man, Star Wars Adventures, Star Wars: Invasion, The Authority, The Example) and illustrated by James Brouwer, which tells the tales of the Nekton family – A multiethnic family of Aquanauts who live on a submarine. The all-ages graphic novel won the Aurealis Award, Australia's premier speculative fiction literary award, for Best illustrated book/graphic novel in 2012 and was also nominated for Best children's illustrated work/picture book.

Plot
The Deep: Here be Dragons is an original Graphic Novel in which we meet the Nekton family, a family who have been exploring the seas for generations. Here Be Dragons sees the Nekton family aboard their state-of-the-art submarine, The Arronax, following strange reports of monster sightings all the way to Greenland. What they discover in those dark depths may change their perceptions of the ocean forever...

Diversity
The Nekton family are notable for their multicultural makeup; the family is composed of a black father, an Asian mother, and their two children. When asked about the make-up of the protagonists in an interview for MTV Geek, writer Tom Taylor started, "The world is a diverse place and not every family of heroes looks like The Incredibles. We haven't made a big deal of this in The Deep. We simply wanted a unique cast of heroes who aren't from anywhere. Their ethnicity and countries of origin aren't talked about or pointed out in the book at all. The sea is huge and covers the globe, and so do the Nekton family."

Television series

In 2015, an animated series premiered on 7TWO and Family Chrgd and produced by Nerd Corps Entertainment, DHX Media and A Stark Production. Three seasons have aired.

References

External links
Exploringthedeep.com", Official Website
EXCLUSIVE: Taylor Explores "The Deep", Comic Book Resources
Take a Journey to “The Deep”…, Comic Booked
Tom Taylor Dives Deep, Broken Frontier

2011 graphic novels
2011 comics debuts
Australian comics titles
Comics adapted into television series
Comics adapted into animated series